The All-Ireland Senior B Hurling Championship of 1977 was the fourth staging of Ireland's secondary hurling knock-out competition.  Laois won the championship, beating London 3-21 to 2-9 in the final at Croke Park, Dublin.

The championship

Format

First round: (3 matches) These are three matches between the first six participating teams.  Three teams are eliminated at this stage while the three winning teams qualify for the semi-final stages.

Semi-finals: (2 matches) The three winners from the first round games join a fourth team who received a bye to this stage to contest the semi-finals.  Two teams are eliminated at this stage while the two winners advance to the 'home' final.

Home final: (1 match) The winners of the two semi-finals contest this game.  One team is eliminated at this stage while the winners advance to the 'proper' All-Ireland final.

Final: (1 match) The winners of the All-Ireland 'home' final join London to contest this game.  One team is eliminated at this stage while the winners are allowed to participate in the All-Ireland SHC quarter-final.

Fixtures

All-Ireland Senior B Hurling Championship

References

 Donegan, Des, The Complete Handbook of Gaelic Games (DBA Publications Limited, 2005).

1977
B